Johan Franzén (11 November 1879, in Övermark – 3 June 1946) was a Finnish farmer, bank director and politician. He was a member of the Parliament of Finland from 1935 to 1936, representing the Swedish People's Party of Finland (SFP).

References

1879 births
1946 deaths
People from Närpes
People from Vaasa Province (Grand Duchy of Finland)
Swedish People's Party of Finland politicians
Members of the Parliament of Finland (1933–36)